The Hindmarsh Incinerator is a decommissioned incinerator located in the Adelaide suburb of  in South Australia, Australia.  Designed by Walter Burley Griffin, the architect and designer of Canberra, the incinerator was built in 1935 by the Reverberatory Incinerator and Engineering Co. Pty Ltd. as a means of disposing of household refuse.

The incinerator was listed on the now-defunct Register of the National Estate on 21 March 1978 and on the South Australian Heritage Register on 24 July 1980. It is listed as a nationally significant work of 20th-century architecture by the Australian Institute of Architects.

References

Incinerators
Buildings and structures in Adelaide
South Australian Heritage Register
Walter Burley Griffin buildings
South Australian places listed on the defunct Register of the National Estate